4-Vinylanisole is an organic compound with the formula CH3OC6H4CH=CH2. It is one of three isomers of vinylanisole.  A colorless liquid, 4-vinylanisole is found in a number of foods and drinks.  It is also a monomer for the synthesis of modified polystyrenes.  It is an aggregation pheromone used by locusts.

References

Pheromones
Phenol ethers
Phenyl compounds